Trun is a commune in the Orne département and the region of Normandy in north-western France.

Geography

Administration

Population

Economy
 Heller SA, manufacturer of plastic scale model kits.
 Electrical

Ruins and monuments
Aerial photography has revealed the trace of a Gallo-Roman habitat. In the 19th century a Merovingian dynasty necropolis was discovered.

Personalities associated with Trun
 Pierre Crestey 1622–1703, religious follower of Saint Vincent de Paul.

Further reading

Notes and references

See also
 Communes of the Orne department

External links

 Official site of the Commune of Trun (in French)
 Trun from times past (in French, but mostly images)

Communes of Orne